7028 may refer to:
 The year in the 8th millennium
7028 'Cadbury Castle', a steam locomotive
7028 Tachikawa, an asteroid